is a Japanese company from Adachi, Tokyo that specialize in radio-controlled cars, it was one of the first manufacturers in Japan to build RC cars and it also invented the RTR (Ready To Run) cars, but most notable of all is their long-running "Dog Fighter" series of radio controlled buggies, mainly through its successes in racing.

History
, as a child, was interested in building model warships and aircraft but became interested in radio-control models when he witnessed people playing with radio-controlled aircraft across the Arakawa River, thus he used monthly tuition money intended for cram school to buy himself an aircraft to participate in the hobby.

As his father was an enthusiast of education, Yokobori Jr. regularly attended the home of a United States Army officer to practice his English conversation skills. After graduation from high school, he resisted his father's persuasion to enter college education in favor of starting his mail order scale model retail business, which thrived as model stores was solely available at metropolitan areas. His sister, who had good command of English, helped him with logistics of goods overseas when business grew. His parents, who ran a confectionery material business, later agreed to help out with the business. Yokobori branched out into his own store, in 1974 at a Mitsuboshi store in Nihonbashi, the first radio-controlled specialty store incorporated in a department store. As a result, business increased twofold and then opened another in Ginza.Yokobori branched out into R/C car production in 1977 when the shop built a ready to run version of Cox's .49ci Dune Buggy, which was sold as a kit. The car became a success and helped to introduced radio controlled cars into Japan.

In 1970, the company would become involved with another US RC car manufacturer, when they imported the RC-1, produced by Associated Electrics, into Japan. As a result, they became involved in the production side of the market, when they manufactured option parts for the car. This was the start of its partnership with Associated which continued to this day.

The company, who became Yokomo, a portmanteau of Yokobori Mokei, soon began producing its own competition RC cars in 1977 with the Mini Racer RC-12. The Porsche 917/30 that was bodyshell of the kit later formed the basis of the company's Can-Am car styled logo.

Its biggest break was in 1983, when it introduced the YZ-834B, the first of the long-running "Dog Fighter" series of 1:10 off-road buggies.

The car was imported into West Germany by Graupner and was marketed as a Graupner Dog Fighter. Although criticized for having ground clearance that was considered to be too low for a typical off-road course, it wasn't until 1985, when Gil Losi, Jr. used the car to score his and the company's first IFMAR title for the inaugural 1:10 Off-Road World Championship 4WD title.

The car was replaced by the YZ-870C, known as the "Super Dog Fighter", jointly developed by Masami Hirosaka, who was brought into the company following his victory at the following IFMAR 1:10 Off-Road 4WD event. His involvement was rewarded, when he successfully defended his crown in 1989. To this date, with the exception of his first title, won driving a Schumacher CAT, all other IFMAR titles he won have been either for Yokomo (six) and its partner for the Japanese market, Team Associated (eight) and still win national titles for the company. Masami's father, Masaaki was an employee for the company.

Yokomo are also known for the infamous and very rare YR-F2 chassis line. Despite being a full-time front-wheel drive RC, the YR-F2 is banned from certain racetracks as it was too fast for other RC's.

In 2003, Yokomo broke the R/C car mould further, when they introduced radio-controlled drifting with a series of cars that was built especially for drifting. Yokomo recently partnered with Tomy in 2008, releasing a series of miniature R/C cars based on its licensed D1GP and drifting cars similar to its R/C line.

Following the decision of Yokobori to retire, Shigeki Suzuki was appointed to replace him as the CEO, effective from October 1, 2019.

See also
YZ-834B
Mini Racer RC-12

References

External links
Official Site of Yokomo Japan
Hobby Haven Sdn.Bhd. (Sole Agent of Yokomo Products in South East Asia)
Autodrift Pte Ltd. (Distributor of Yokomo Drift Products in Singapore)

 
Radio-controlled car manufacturers
Manufacturing companies based in Tokyo
Model manufacturers of Japan